Operation Lone Star is a joint mission between the Texas Department of Public Safety and the Texas Military Department along the southern border between Texas and Mexico. Launched in March 2021, the stated purpose according to Texas Governor Greg Abbott is to counter illegal immigration and the illegal drug trade. The effort has involved as many as 10,000 military personnel, and resulted in some 160,000 apprehensions. It is a distinct state led initiative separate from other federal forces operating in support of a similar mission in the area. As of December 2021, there was no projected end date.

The mission faced public criticism, including from state officials, following reports of pay delays, poor working and living conditions, a lack of proper equipment and facilities, and multiple suicides and suicide attempts among service members. According to reporting in the Army Times, soldiers were being housed in what it describes as cramped quarters, in converted recreational vehicles and semi-truck trailers, and also faced shortages in cold weather uniforms, medical equipment, and portable toilets. According to the Houston Chronicle, this was further compounded when it coincided with state cuts in educational benefits for service members to address budget shortfalls, reducing available tuition assistance by more than half.

On January 13, 2022, a state district court judge in Travis County, Texas, granted Jesus Alberto Guzman Curipoma, of Ecuador, a writ of habeas corpus, ruling that the state program violated the supremacy clause of the United States Constitution. On February 25, 2022, the Third Court of Appeals in Austin affirmed the decision of the lower court.

References

Mexico–United States border
Texas Military Forces
Constitutional law
Immigrant rights
Immigration